Die Kontrakte des Kaufmanns. Eine Wirtschaftskomödie is a play by Austrian playwright Elfriede Jelinek. It was first published in 2009.

References

Plays by Elfriede Jelinek
2009 plays
Austrian plays
Comedy plays